Edmond Couchot (16 August 1932 – 26 December 2020) was a French digital artist and art theoretician who taught at the University Paris VIII.

Life and work
Couchot was a Doctor of aesthetics in the visual arts. From 1982-2000 he headed the department of Arts and Technologies of the Image at the University Paris VIII. He continued to take part in speculative and hands-on study of digital imagery and virtual reality at University Paris VIII.

As a theoretician Dr. Couchot was interested in the connection between art and technology, in particular between the visual arts and data-processing techniques. He published approximately 100 articles on the digital and 3 books.

As a visual artist Dr. Couchot formed cybernetic devices requiring the participation of the spectator in the 1960s. He extended his investigation with digital interactive art and was involved in numerous international digital art exhibitions.

References

Articles 

«Le fantôme d'Humphrey Bogart ou Quelques questions sur la technologie», Recherches sociologiques, Les sociologies, volume XIII, N°1-2, 1982.
«La synthèse numérique de l'image : vers un nouvel ordre visuel», revue Traverses, n°26, octobre 1982.
«Prise de vue, prise de temps», Les cahiers de la photo, n°8, mars 1983.
«Images numériques» («Digital images») et
«Images et Electricité» («Images and Electricity»), catalogue de l'exposition «Electra», Musée d'Art Moderne de la Ville de Paris, décembre 1983.
«Image puissance image», Revue d'esthétique, n°7, juin 1984.
«Sens et contiguïté : la contagion de l'image», revue Traverses, n°32, août 1984.
«Les lendemains de la machine», ouvrage collectif autour de l'exposition «Les Immatériaux», 1984, 34 auteurs pour un colloque, CCI-Centre Georges Pompidou, mars 1985.
«Hybridations», ouvrage collectif Modernes et après; les Immatériaux, Autrement, avril 1985.
«Entrée des artistes», ouvrage collectif La provocation : Hommes et machines en société, CESTA, mai 1985.
«A la recherche du Temps réel», revue Traverses, n°35, septembre 1985.
«Tissage, Métissage : une culture numérique», actes du colloque «L'Imaginaire numérique», Imaginaire numérique, Hermès, avril 1986.
«Temps numérique et communication», revue Temps libre, 1985.
«Une double compétence : pourquoi faire?», actes de «La semaine de l'image électronique», CESTA, avril 1986.
«(Le masque et l'écran)», Revue d'esthétique, n°10, (Vidéo-Vidéo), juillet 1986.
«Von Bild zur Digitalkultur», Ars electronica 86; Computer Tage, actes du colloque de Linz, juin 1986.
«The training of artists in computer graphics», Computers and the Humanities, Paradigm Press, inc., Osprey, Florida, États-Unis, juillet-septembre 1986.
«Médias et Immédias», ouvrage collectif Art et Communication, Osiris, Paris, décembre 1986.
«La mémoire vive», Japon, Art vivant, n°1, janvier 1987.
«Les deux mondes», actes du 2e colloque «L'Imaginaire numérique», Imaginaire numérique, Hermès,1986.
«Sujet, Objet, Image», ouvrage collectif Nouvelles images, nouveau réel – Cahier internationaux de sociologie, PUF, Paris, janvier-juin 1987.
«Pluie, vapeur et vitesse – Lumière et calcul dans les processus automatiques de génération d'images», collectif La vitesse, revue Corps écrit, n°24, PUF, Paris, décembre 1987.
«Synthèse et simulation : l'autre image», ouvrage collectif Contre-bande, revue Hors-Cadre, PUV, avril 1988.
«Vices et vertus du virtuel», in actes du colloqueVers une culture de l'interactivité, Cité des Sciences et de l'Industrie, La Villette, Paris, mai 1988.
«La mosaïque ordonnée ou l'écran saisi par le calcul», Revue d'esthétique, septembre 1988.
«L'Odyssée, mille fois ou Les machines à langage», revue Traverses, n° 44-45, août 1988.
«HD-GC, une hybridation nécessaire», Computer Image & Hi-vision, CG 88, Tokyo, novembre 1988.
«La synthèse du temps», Les chemins du virtuel : Simulation informatique et création industrielle, Cahiers du CCI, Centre Georges Pompidou, Paris, avril 1989.
«Des images en quête d'auteur», ouvrage collectif Faire image, PUV, juillet 1989.
«Art et technique. L'émergence du numérique», collectif Arts de l'ère numérique, revue La pensée, n° 268, mars-avril 1989.
«Les années de la synthèse», catalogue de l'exposition Nos années 80, Fondation Cartier, juin 1989.
«La question du temps dans les techniques électroniques et numériques de l'image», 3e semaine internationale de Vidéo, Saint-Gervais Genève, novembre 1989.
«Programmer l'invisible», revue Littérature, Anatomie de l'emblème, n° 78, mai 1990.
«Boites noires», catalogue de l'exposition Art vidéo/ Art cinéma/ Art ordinateur, Paris, janvier 1990.
«Trance machines» (en anglais et en néerlandais), in catalogue de l'exposition What a wonderful world! Music video in architecture, Groningen Museum, Pays-Bas, 1990.
«De la représentation à la simulation. Evolution des techniques et des arts de la figuration», Culture technique (Images, techniques et société), février 1991.
«De la représentation à la simulation. Evolution des techniques et des arts de la figuration», revue Culture technique (Images, techniques et société), février 1991.
«Un fracassant Big Bang», revue Cinémas, Québec, 1991.
«Die Spiele des Realen und des Virtuellen», Digitaler Schein Ästhetik der elektronischen Medien Herausgegeben von Florian Rötzer, edition Suhrkamp, 1991.
«Une responsabilité assistée? Esthétique de la simulation», revue Art Press (Nouvelles technologies...), 1991.
«Utopie et uchronie : les univers virtuels de la simulation numérique», in Actes du quatrième colloque international de science-fiction de Nice, Revue du Centre de la Métaphore, Nice-Sophia Antipolis, 1992.
«Résonance. La condition d’intelligibilité de l’image», revue Littérature (La moiré de l’image), octobre 1992.
«Incidence du numérique sur l’art», revue Le Croquant, n° 12, 1992.
«Une marge étroite mais fertile (À l’interface du réel et du virtuel)», Revue virtuelle, n° 1, Centre G. Pompidou, avril 1992.
«L’interactivité dans la relation homme/machine», en collaboration avec M. Bret et M.-H. Tramus, collectif Les clés d’une communication réussie, Dunod, Paris, 1992.
« Zwischen Reellem und Virtuellem : Die Kunst der Hybridation », in Cyberspace. Zum medialem Gesamtkunstwerk, Boer, Munich, 1993.
« Les objets-temps : Au-delà de la forme », catalogue de l’exposition Design, du XIXe au XXIe siècle, Flammarion, mai 1993.
« Des outils, des mots et des figures. Vers un nouvel état de l’art », revue Réseaux, CNET, septembre 1993.
« Da Representação à Simulação », A imagen-machina.  era das tecnologias do virtual, UFRJ, Rio de Janeiro, novembre 1993.
« Le geste et le calcul », revue Protée, automne 1993.
« Rupture et continuité – Les incidences du numérique sur l’art contemporain », collectif L’art d’aujourd’hui – Nouveaux concepts, nouveaux outils, revue Les Papiers, Presse Universitaires du Mirail, Toulouse, 1994.
« Rupture et continuité – Les incidences du numérique sur l’art contemporain », collectif L’art d’aujourd’hui – Nouveaux concepts, nouveaux outils, revue Les Papiers, Presses Universitaires du Mirail, Toulouse, 1994.
« Au-delà du cinéma. Image et temps numériques », actes du colloque Le temps au cinéma, Revue Cinémas, AQEC, Québec, 1994.
« Between the Real and the Virtual : The art of hybridization », Annual InterCommunication, Tokyo, 1994.
« Images, automatisme et subjectivité », publications du Collège iconique, groupe de recherche du Dépôt Légal, INA, 1994.
« Un supplément de temps. De la synthèse de l’image à la synthèse du temps »,
actes du colloque La pensée de l’image, revue Littérature, 1994.
« Le temps réel et l’interactivité dans les arts visuels », Technoculture Matrix, NTT Publishing, Tokyo, juin 1994, (en japonais).
« Les promesses de l’hybridation numérique », X, l’œuvre en procès, ouvrage collectif, Publications de la Sorbonne, janvier 1996.
« Du style et des images de synthèse », revue LIGEIA, n° 17-18, 1995-96.
« L’imagerie virtuelle : une entreprise de purification du réel », actes du colloque L’image – le su et l’insu, Sorbonne, 25 mars 1995, paru en septembre 1996.
« Des changements dans la hiérarchie du sensible – Le retour du corps », in Les Cinq sens et la création – Art, technologie et création, Champ Vallon, 1996.
« Entre lo real y lo virtual : un arte de la hibridación », in Arte en la era electrónica, Claudia Giametti, ed., Barcelona, 1997.
« Autre corps, autre image – autre image, autre corps », in Epipháneia, Minervini Editore, Napoli, avril 1997.
« A arte pode ainda ser um relógio que adiante ? O author, a obra e o espectador na hora do tempo real », in A arte no século XXXI, UNESP, Brésil, 1997.
« Problem czasu w elektronicznych i cyfrowych technicach obrazu », revue OPCJE, Pologne, 1997.« Présence et présent du corps dans les arts interactifs », in Pour une Écologie des Médias, Revue ASTARTI-Pour l’Art Audiovisuel, Paris, 1998.
« Un hyperlien social ? », in Troisième Millénaire, le lien social, Revue La Mazarine, juin 1999.
« Medien und Neu ‘Medien’ : Von der Kommunikation zur Kommutation », Bield, Medium, Kunst, Wilhelm Fink Verlag, München, 1999.
« Contact et calcul dans les techniques figuratives », Revue Nouvelles de l’estampe, n° 167-8, BN de France, 1999-2000.
« L’art numérique : dissolution ou hybridation? », Revue Recherches en Esthétique, n° 6, oct. 2000.
« L’embarquement pour Cyber. Mythes et réalités de l’art en réseau », Revue d’Esthétique, n° 39, juillet 2001.
« La critique face à l’art numérique : Une introduction à la question », actes du séminaire Interart 1999-2000 — La Critique : le rapport à l’œuvre —, Klincksieck 2001; cet article est en ligne sur les sites du CICV et de l’Université de Rennes (revue en ligne Solaris).
« Digital Hybridisation. A Technique, an Aesthetic », Revue Convergence, n° 4, décembre 2002.
« L’art numérique », Encyclopaedia Universalis, 2002.
« De la communication à la commutation : l’art et le Web », Revue Ligeia — Art et Multimédia —, juillet-décembre 2003.
«Virtuel» & «Arts technologiques», Grand Dictionnaire de la Philosophie, Larousse, Paris, 2003.
«A segunda interativida. Em direção a novas práticas artísticas», in collaboration with M.-H. Tramus & M. Bret, Arte e vida no século XXI, UNESP, Brazil, 2003.
« Corps hybrides, les jeux du réel et du virtuel », Revue Visio, Actes du 6e congrès international de sémiotique visuelle, Québec, 2004.
à paraître :
« The Automatization of Figurative Techniques: towards the Autonomous Image », in Media Art History (titre provisoire), MIT Press, EU.

Books

 Image. De l'optique au numérique, Hermès, Paris, 1988.
 La Technologie dans l’art. De la photographie à la réalité virtuelle, Éditions Jacqueline Chambon, 1998; 271 pages.
A tecnologia na arte. Da fotografica à realidade virtual, (traduction en portugais par Sandra Rey de La technologie dans l’art. De la photographie à la réalité virtuelle), 2003, Universidade federal do Rio Grande do Sul,  319 pages.
 Dialogues sur l’art et la technologie Autour d’Edmond Couchot, sous la direction de François Soulages, L’Harmattan, 2001.
 L’Art numérique. Comment la technologie vient au monde de l’art, Flammarion, février 2003, en collaboration avec Norbert Hillaire.
Réédition en 2005, chez le même éditeur, collection "Champs".
 Des Images, du temps et des machines, édité Actes Sud, 2007
La plume (1988) (en collaboration avec Michel Bret)
Pissenlit (1990) (en collaboration avec Michel Bret)
Ces œuvres (in progress) ont subi de très nombreuse modifications depuis leur origine et ont fait l'objet des expositions suivantes

Digital installations 

1988	Pixim (Paris)
1992	The Robots (Nagoya; Japan)
1995	Press/Enter (Toronto; Canada)
1995	Images du Futur (Montréal; Canada)
1995	Biennale Internationnale de Kwangju (Korea)
1998 	Exposition Art virtuel, création interactives
	et multisensorielles (Boulogne-Billancourt; France)
1999	Bienal Mercosul (Porto Alegre; Brésil)
2000	Art Numérique (Centre culturel Saint-Exupéry; Reims)
2001	Art.outsiders (Maison Européenne de la photographie; Paris)
2003	Le Voyage de l’Homme immobile (Musée d’art contemporain; Gène)
2005	Natural/Digital (numeriscausa à la Biche de Bère Gallery; Paris)

La Maison Européenne de la Photographie  acquis l’œuvre Je souffle à tout vent, en septembre 2001.

External links 

1932 births
2020 deaths
French digital artists
Academic staff of Paris 8 University Vincennes-Saint-Denis
Postmodern artists
French contemporary artists
New media artists
Mass media theorists